The Wedding may refer to:

Books and plays 
 The Wedding (Sparks novel), a 2003 romance novel by Nicholas Sparks
 The Wedding (Steel novel), a 2000 romance novel by Danielle Steel
 The Wedding!, The Amazing Spider-Man Annual #21
 Les Noces barbares (The Wedding), a 1985 novel by Yann Queffélec (winner of Prix Goncourt)
 The Wedding, a 1968 novel Dasma by Ismail Kadare
 The Wedding, a romance novel by Julie Garwood
 The Wedding, a novel by Dorothy West

Theatre 
 The Wedding (1629 play), a Caroline era stage play by James Shirley
 The Wedding (1901 play) (Wesele), a Polish play by Stanisław Wyspiański
 The Wedding (Chekhov play), a play by Anton Chekhov

Film and television

Film
 The Wedding (1944 film), a Russian film directed by Isidor Annensky
 The Wedding (1972 film), a Polish film directed by Andrzej Wajda
 The Wedding (2000 film), a French-Russian film directed by Pavel Lungin
 The Wedding (2004 film), a Polish film directed by Wojciech Smarzowski
 The Wedding (2018 film), an American film directed by Sam Abbas

Television

Series 
 The Wedding (miniseries), a 1998 American drama miniseries
 The Wedding (TV series), a 2009 Philippine romantic comedy series

Episodes 
 "The Wedding" (Diff'rent Strokes)
 "The Wedding" (Drake & Josh)
 "The Wedding" (Dynasty 1982)
 "The Wedding" (Dynasty 1983)
 "The Wedding" (Dynasty 1989)
 "The Wedding" (Full House)
 "The Wedding" (How I Met Your Mother)
 "The Wedding" (The Jeffersons)
 "The Wedding" (Kate & Allie)
 "The Wedding" (Life with Derek)
 "The Wedding" (Mama's Family)
 "The Wedding" (Modern Family)
 "The Wedding" (Outlander)
 "The Wedding" (Outnumbered)
 "The Wedding" (Roseanne 1991)
 "The Wedding" (Roseanne 1996)
 "The Wedding" (Spider-Man episode)
 "The Wedding" (The Story of Tracy Beaker)
 "The Wedding" (The West Wing)
 "The Wedding" (Will & Grace)

Music 
 Les noces (The Wedding ), a ballet by Igor Stravinsky
 The Wedding (band), an American rock band

Albums
 The Wedding Album (disambiguation)
 The Wedding (Oneida album), 2005
 The Wedding (The Wedding album), 2005

Songs
 "The Wedding", a 1958 song by June Valli.
 "The Wedding" (song), a 1965 song by Julie Rogers

Other media
"The Wedding", the third area of the PlayStation 3 video game, LittleBigPlanet

See also
 The Wedding Singer
 "The Wedding Song"
 Wedding (disambiguation)